Dorohoi is a city in Botoșani County, Romania, on the right bank of the river Jijia, which broadens into a lake on the north.

History

Dorohoi used to be a market for the timber and farm produce of the north Moldavian highlands; merchants from the neighboring states flocked to its great fair, held on the June 12. The settlement is first mentioned in documents from 1408, where a treaty was signed between Moldavian voievode, Alexandru cel Bun, and the King of Poland and Hungary.

Dorohoi was bombed by the Russians during World War I.

Dorohoi used to be the capital of Dorohoi County, but was degraded to a municipality when the Soviet Union occupied Bessarabia and Northern Bukovina in late June 1940. On July 1, 1940, units of the Romanian Army attacked local Jews in a pogrom. These military actions against the Jews were not endorsed by the Romanian Government. When the conspiracy against the Jews was discovered by the military command, troops were sent to end the abuse.

Geography

2010 Romanian floods

Several roads into Dorohoi remained either washed away or under water. The heavy rain that had been falling for close to a week had forecasters warning that it would continue in northeast Romania. The unusually heavy rain killed 6 people, most in the town of Dorohoi on the 29th.

Demographics

According to the census from 2011 there was a total population of 22,600 people living in this city. Of this population, 98.13% are ethnic Romanians, 1.54% ethnic Romani, 0.07% ethnic Jews and 0.02% ethnic Ukrainians.

Jews of Dorohoi 

Jews first settled in Dorohoi in the 17th century. It was set up as a Jewish Guild under Moldavia. Jews suffered here during World War I.

There were 600 Jewish families in Dorohoi in 1803.
3,031 people in 1859 (roughly half of the population)
6,804 in 1899 (more than half of the population)
5,800 in 1930s

The Jewish population actually increased after the Holocaust as a result of refugees settling there. In 1947, there were 7,600 Jews living in Dorohoi. Following the establishment of Israel, the Jewish population of the Dorohoi steadily decreased. In 1956, there were 2,753 Jews. In 1966, there were 1,013. By 2000, there were only 49 Jews left in Dorohoi.

Natives 
 Benjamin Abrams, businessman
 Alexandru Batcu, general
 Ion Călugăru, novelist
 Dumitru Chipăruș, sculptor
 Dan Condurache, film actor
 Octavian Cotescu, actor
 Maurice Hartt, politician
 Vasile Hutopilă, painter
 Theodor V. Ionescu, physicist
 Alexandre Istrati, painter
 Gheorghe Liliac, footballer 
 Alexandru Mavrodi journalist
 Gheorghe Nichita, politician
 Marcel Olinescu, engraver
 Dan Pița, film director and screenwriter
 Nicolae Samsonovici, general
 Păstorel Teodoreanu, humorist and poet

Attractions
A little to the Eastern outer limits of the city, on the way to Broscăuți, tourists may find Saint Nicholas Church, an edifice built by Ștefan cel Mare in 1495. Exorcisms have been officiated here until the late 2000s.

Government
The city administers three villages: Dealu Mare, Loturi Enescu and Progresul.

References

External links 

  
 Jewish Dorohoi

 
Cities in Romania
Capitals of former Romanian counties
Ținutul Suceava
Holocaust locations in Romania
Populated places in Botoșani County
Localities in Western Moldavia